Broadman may refer to:

People with the surname Broadman
Beverly Broadman, journalist
Harry G. Broadman, businessman

Other uses
Broadman Press, a predecessor of B&H Publishing Group